Fāṭima bint al-Ḥasan ibn ʿAlī, was a daughter of Hasan ibn Ali and Umm Ishaq bint Talha. She was married to Ali ibn Husayn Zayn al-Abidin (the fourth Shi'ite Imam), and became the mother of Muhammad al-Baqir (the fifth Twelver Imam). Her kunya was Umm ʿAbd Allāh and she was referred to as al-Ṣiddīqa ("the very truthful one") by her husband Ali. It has also been reported that her features were such, that no one in the family of Hasan ibn Ali looked like her.

References

Battle of Karbala
7th-century women
7th-century Arabs
Hasanids
7th-century people from the Umayyad Caliphate
Women from the Umayyad Caliphate
Wives of Shiite Imams